The Water Horse: Legend of the Deep – Original Motion Picture Soundtrack is a soundtrack album which contains James Newton Howard's original score to Jay Russell's 2007 film of the same name. Sinéad O'Connor and The Chieftains each contribute a song to the soundtrack as well.

Track listing

References

2007 soundtrack albums
Fantasy film soundtracks